The 9th British Academy Film Awards, given by the British Academy of Film and Television Arts in 1956, honoured the best films of 1955.

Winners and nominees

Best Film
 Richard III 
Bad Day at Black Rock
Carmen Jones
The Colditz Story
The Dam Busters
East of Eden
The Ladykillers
Marty
The Night My Number Came Up
The Prisoner
Seven Samurai
Simba
La Strada
Summertime

Best British Film
 Richard III 
The Colditz Story
The Dam Busters
The Ladykillers
The Night My Number Came Up
The Prisoner
Simba

Best Foreign Actor
 Ernest Borgnine in Marty 
James Dean in East of Eden
Jack Lemmon in Mister Roberts
Frank Sinatra in Not as a Stranger
Toshirō Mifune in Seven Samurai
Takashi Shimura in Seven Samurai

Best British Actor
 Laurence Olivier in Richard III 
Alfie Bass in The Bespoke Overcoat
Kenneth More in The Deep Blue Sea
Michael Redgrave in The Night My Number Came Up
Jack Hawkins in The Prisoner
Alec Guinness in The Prisoner

Best British Actress
 Katie Johnson in The Ladykillers 
Margaret Lockwood in Cast a Dark Shadow
Deborah Kerr in The End of the Affair
Margaret Johnston in Touch and Go

Best Foreign Actress
 Betsy Blair in Marty 
Dorothy Dandridge in Carmen Jones
Grace Kelly in The Country Girl
Julie Harris in I Am a Camera
Marilyn Monroe in The Seven Year Itch
Judy Garland in A Star Is Born
Giulietta Masina in La Strada
Katharine Hepburn in Summertime

Best British Screenplay
 The Ladykillers - William Rose

Best Animated Film
 Blinkity Blank
Lady and the Tramp

References

Film009
1955 film awards
1956 in British cinema
March 1956 events in the United Kingdom
1956 in London